Terra Eve Lawson-Remer (born July 1978) is an American politician, economist, and professor serving as a member of the San Diego County Board of Supervisors since 2021. She was elected Vice Chair on January 10, 2023. A member of the Democratic Party, Lawson-Remer previously worked as a professor at The New School and the University of California, San Diego, and as a senior advisor in the U.S. Treasury Department.

Born in San Diego, Lawson-Remer grew up in the Mission Hills neighborhood and attended La Jolla High School. Lawson-Remer graduated from Yale University with a bachelor's degree in ethics, politics, and economics in 2000, later attending New York University, where she received a Juris Doctor and Doctor of Philosophy. After her education, Lawson-Remer worked for the World Bank and the U.S. Treasury Department during the Barack Obama administration. She then became a professor at The New School and the University of California, San Diego, teaching public policy.

In 2020, Lawson-Remer campaigned to become a supervisor in the San Diego County Board of Supervisors, successfully defeating the Republican incumbent Kristin Gaspar. By winning the supervisory seat, Lawson-Remer shifted control of the Board of Supervisors toward the Democrats for the first time in a generation.

Early life
Terra Eve Lawson-Remer was born in July 1978 in San Diego, California. Her father, Larry Remer, was born in Montclair, New Jersey, to a Jewish family and worked as an investigative journalist who would become a political consultant later in his career. Lawson-Remer's mother, Shari Lawson, worked as a lawyer. Her parents met each other while organizing protests in opposition to the Vietnam War and eventually married in July 1977 with Earl Ben Gilliam, a San Diego County Superior Court judge, officiating their marriage. Lawson-Remer's paternal grandparents were Herbert and Beverly Remer. Herbert owned a company that imported goods mostly from Switzerland and Scandinavia and served in the Pacific Ocean theater of World War II as part of the United States Navy. Meanwhile, Beverly was a schoolteacher in the Bronx who worked toward desegregating the city's schools. Lawson-Remer's maternal grandfather, Frank Lawson, served in the United States Marine Corps and was stationed at Camp Pendleton and killed in action during the Korean War in 1950. Lawson-Remer has a sister named Alexa.

Lawson-Remer grew up in Mission Hills and graduated from La Jolla High School in 1996. In 2000, Lawson-Remer graduated from Yale University with a bachelor's degree in ethics, politics, and economics. She later attended New York University, where she received a Juris Doctor in 2006 and a Doctor of Philosophy in political economy in 2010.

Early career and activism

While president of her high school class in 1994, Lawson-Remer participated in a student walkout in opposition to Proposition 187, a ballot measure related to illegal immigration in California. Her involvement in the walkout prompted the school administrators to strip Lawson-Remer of her class presidency. In 1999, Lawson-Remer protested against a World Trade Organization meeting in Seattle, resulting in police arresting her. Lawson-Remer was one of nearly 14,000 law students in 2003 who submitted an amicus curiae in Grutter v. Bollinger, voicing support for affirmative action in college admissions.

On August 26, 2004, Lawson-Remer participated in Operation Sybil, a New York protest against the upcoming Republican National Convention, rappelling the Plaza Hotel to place a sign in opposition to president George W. Bush. New York police arrested her and several other co-organizers, charging them with felony and misdemeanor charges of assault, reckless endangerment, and criminal trespass. Lawson-Remer said Bush and vice president Dick Cheney were "taking [the country] in the wrong direction" and accused them of deception on the Iraq War, healthcare, and the economy.

Lawson-Remer worked for Amnesty International, PlaNet Finance on behalf of the World Bank, and as a senior advisor in the U.S. Treasury Department during the Barack Obama administration. She also taught public policy as a professor at The New School and the University of California, San Diego. In 2014, Lawson-Remer appeared in an episode of Vice to discuss the effects of the resource curse in Papua New Guinea. Along with fifteen other applicants, Lawson-Remer applied to the Encinitas City Council in 2017, hoping to fill a seat left vacant after Catherine Blakespear became the city's mayor. In 2017–2018, Lawson-Remer was a fellow at Stanford University's Center for Advanced Study in the Behavioral Sciences and the Berggruen Institute. She led the Flip the 49th campaign to defeat Republican U.S. representative Darrell Issa in California's 49th district in 2018.

In 2019, Lawson-Remer received the Grawemeyer Award from the University of Louisville alongside Sakiko Fukuda-Parr and Susan Randolph for their book entitled Fulfilling Social and Economic Rights, which made a "significant contribution to world order" by "inform[ing] domestic and international policies, aid[ing] in the work of non-governmental organizations and provid[ing] a way to evaluate performance in a truly comparative perspective."

San Diego County Board of Supervisors

2020 election

On January 28, 2019, Lawson-Remer announced her candidacy in the third district of the San Diego County Board of Supervisors, contending for a seat held by conservative Republican Kristin Gaspar. In June 2019, Lawson-Remer received the endorsement of SEIU Local 221, the largest labor union in San Diego County. Escondido Mayor Paul McNamara withdrew his endorsement of Escondido City Councilwoman Olga Diaz, a fellow Democrat, on December 3, 2019, to support Lawson-Remer's campaign. On December 24, 2019, San Diego County Superior Court Judge Timothy Taylor required Lawson-Remer to revise her title in her ballot description, in which she indicated she was an attorney. However, because the State Bar of California did not license her, Lawson-Remer cannot refer to herself as an attorney without indicating the state where she has a license, which was New York in her case.

Democratic U.S. representative Juan Vargas, a friend of Lawson-Remer's father, endorsed her campaign to become a county supervisor in January 2020. In the March 2020 primary election, Lawson-Remer defeated Diaz to move on to the general election against Gaspar. After the election, San Diego Association of Governments executive director Hasan Ikhrata made the highest possible campaign donation to Lawson-Remer. Between February 16 through June 30, 2020, Lawson-Remer received more campaign contributions than Gaspar.

Several months before the November election, Lawson-Remer received a deluge of endorsements from California Democratic politicians hoping to flip the Republican-held seat, including governor Gavin Newsom, State Senate president pro tempore Toni Atkins, and San Diego county supervisor Nathan Fletcher. In October, Lawson-Remer received the endorsement of The San Diego Union-Tribune editorial board, who endorsed her Republican opponent in 2016. An October 2020 Voice of San Diego poll showed that 42% of likely voters would vote or leaned in favor of voting for Lawson-Remer, as opposed to 31% for Gaspar, whose support for Donald Trump undermined her chances of reelection.

On October 12, 2020, Lawson-Remer challenged Gaspar in a KUSI debate, and she went on to defeat her Republican opponent on November 3 to shift the balance of power of the San Diego County Board of Supervisors in favor of the Democrats. Heading into the election, the Republicans held a 4–1 majority in the Board of Supervisors, ending up as a 3–2 Democratic majority afterward, establishing Democratic control for the "first time in at least a generation," according to the Voice of San Diego. Lawson-Remer's victory ensured simultaneous Democratic control of the San Diego mayor's office, the San Diego City Council, and the San Diego County Board of Supervisors.

Tenure
After winning the election, Lawson-Remer became a member of the Board of Supervisors after being sworn in on January 4, 2021. The swearing-in ceremony occurred between 10 and 11 a.m., with Lawson-Remer sworn in after Nora Vargas and Joel Anderson. Lawson-Remer recited the oath of office with state Senator Toni Atkins and Judge M. Margaret McKeown of the United States Court of Appeal for the Ninth Circuit, which was done so virtually due to the ongoing COVID-19 pandemic.

Political positions

Lawson-Remer supported lifting San Diego County's ban on businesses selling recreational cannabis in unincorporated areas, favoring market regulation instead of prohibitive policy. On climate change, she wanted to put together a plan that involved adopting a Community Choice Aggregation program setting a timeline for 90% clean energy, support for mitigation banking, and other initiatives. Lawson-Remer suggested providing incentives for developers building affordable housing as a means to resolve San Diego's housing crisis.  She supported the implementation of smart growth to curb sprawl. Lawson-Remer said that racism in the United States continued to be a problem locally and nationally. She opposed outsourcing the jail medical and mental health services of the San Diego County Sheriff's Department. Lawson-Remer criticized San Diego County's response to the COVID-19 pandemic, seeing the county as unready to handle outbreaks.

On the United States' investment in multilateral development banks, Lawson-Remer supported continued investment in these financial institutions on the basis that such investment develops and maintains national security. She argued that the G20 lacked legitimacy as an international actor because of issues surrounding the institution's transparency and accountability, believing that the G20 needed greater involvement of the people whose policies they affect.

Personal life
Lawson-Remer resides in Encinitas, California, where she raises her daughter Eeva Kai as a single mother. Lawson-Remer is non-binary and pansexual. Explaining why she became a politician, Lawson-Remer cited Hillary Clinton's loss in the 2016 United States presidential election. Lawson-Remer's sister, Alexa, works as an associate at Sullivan & Cromwell. In 2018, the National LGBT Bar Association named her sister one of the Best LGBT Lawyers Under 40.

Electoral history

Publications

References

External links
 
 Column archives at Foreign Policy and HuffPost

1978 births
21st-century American economists
21st-century American educators
21st-century American lawyers
21st-century American non-fiction writers
21st-century American politicians
Activists from California
American anti–Iraq War activists
American political activists
Amnesty International people
California Democrats
Candidates in the 2020 United States elections
Economists from California
Jewish American academics
Jewish American activists
Jewish American attorneys
Jewish American economists
Jewish American government officials
Jewish American people in California politics
Jewish American writers
LGBT academics
LGBT lawyers
LGBT people from California
American LGBT politicians
Living people
New York University School of Law alumni
Obama administration personnel
Politicians from San Diego
San Diego County Board of Supervisors members
The New School faculty
United States Department of the Treasury officials
University of California, San Diego faculty
World Bank people
Yale University alumni
Pansexual non-binary people
American non-binary writers